The Journal of Marketing Education is a triannual peer-reviewed academic journal that publishes papers on marketing education. It is a member of the Committee on Publication Ethics (COPE) and committed to ethical practices in publishing. The editor-in-chief is Donald R. Bacon (Boise State University). It was established in 1979 and is currently published by SAGE Publications.

Abstracting and indexing 
The journal is abstracted and indexed in:
 ABI/INFORM
 Business Source Complete
 Scopus
 SocINDEX
 ZETOC
 SCImago Journal Rank

External links

References

SAGE Publishing academic journals
English-language journals
Business and management journals
Education journals
Triannual journals
Publications established in 1979
Marketing education